Poteau may refer to:
A type of pillory (French for "pole")
In Canada, a paper candidate

As a proper noun, Poteau may refer to:
Poteau, Liège, Belgium, between the municipalities of St. Vith and Vielsalm
Poteau, Oklahoma, USA
Poteau River, a river in Oklahoma and Arkansas